Eliane Rosa Naika (born March 31, 1955 in Majunga) is a Malagasy politician.  She is a member of the Senate of Madagascar for Menabe, and is a member of the Tiako I Madagasikara party.

References
Official page on the Senate website 

1955 births
Living people
Members of the Senate (Madagascar)
Tiako I Madagasikara politicians
21st-century Malagasy women politicians
21st-century Malagasy politicians
People from Boeny